Rondelet Records was a British independent record label started by Alan Campion, who owned a record shop in Mansfield, Nottinghamshire in the early 1980s. The label published many punk groups including Special Duties, The Threats, Deadman's Shadow, Riot Squad and Anti-Pasti.

The label also featured some bands from the new wave of British heavy metal, including Witchfynde, who toured with Def Leppard in their early days.

The label had some success with Special Duties, Anti-Pasti and Witchfynde, whose songs and albums reached the national charts. However, by the mid 1980s the label folded, though some of the bands are still touring today.

British independent record labels
Mansfield
Defunct record labels of the United Kingdom
Punk record labels
1980 establishments in England
1980s disestablishments in England